In logic, the law of non-contradiction (LNC) (also known as the law of contradiction, principle of non-contradiction (PNC), or the principle of contradiction) states that contradictory propositions cannot both be true in the same sense at the same time, e. g. the two propositions "p is the case" and "p is not the case" are mutually exclusive. Formally this is expressed as the tautology ¬(p ∧ ¬p). The law is not to be confused with the law of excluded middle which states that at least one, "p is the case" or "p is not the case" holds.

One reason to have this law is the principle of explosion, which states that anything follows from a contradiction. The law is employed in a reductio ad absurdum proof.

To express the fact that the law is tenseless and to avoid equivocation, sometimes the law is amended to say "contradictory propositions cannot both be true 'at the same time and in the same sense'". 

It is one of the so called three laws of thought,  along with its complement, the law of excluded middle, and the law of identity. However, no system of logic is built on just these laws, and none of these laws provide inference rules, such as modus ponens or De Morgan's laws.

The law of non-contradiction and the law of excluded middle create a dichotomy in "logical space", wherein the two parts are "mutually exclusive" and "jointly exhaustive". The law of non-contradiction is merely an expression of the mutually exclusive aspect of that dichotomy, and the law of excluded middle, an expression of its jointly exhaustive aspect.

Interpretations 
One difficulty in applying the law of non-contradiction is ambiguity in the propositions. For instance, if it is not explicitly specified as part of the propositions A and B, then A may be B at one time, and not at another. A and B may in some cases be made to sound mutually exclusive linguistically even though A may be partly B and partly not B at the same time. However, it is impossible to predicate of the same thing, at the same time, and in the same sense, the absence and the presence of the same fixed quality.

Heraclitus 
According to both Plato and Aristotle, Heraclitus was said to have denied the law of non-contradiction. This is quite likely if, as Plato pointed out, the law of non-contradiction does not hold for changing things in the world. If a philosophy of Becoming is not possible without change, then (the potential of) what is to become must already exist in the present object. In "We step and do not step into the same rivers; we are and we are not", both Heraclitus's and Plato's object simultaneously must, in some sense, be both what it now is and have the potential (dynamic) of what it might become.

So little remains of Heraclitus' aphorisms that not much about his philosophy can be said with certainty. He seems to have held that strife of opposites is universal both within and without, therefore both opposite existents or qualities must simultaneously exist, although in some instances in different respects. "The road up and down are one and the same" implies either the road leads both ways, or there can be no road at all. This is the logical complement of the law of non-contradiction. According to Heraclitus, change, and the constant conflict of opposites is the universal logos of nature.

Protagoras 
Personal subjective perceptions or judgments can only be said to be true at the same time in the same respect, in which case, the law of non-contradiction must be applicable to personal judgments.
The most famous saying of Protagoras is: "Man is the measure of all things: of things which are, that they are, and of things which are not, that they are not". However, Protagoras was referring to things that are used by or in some way related to humans. This makes a great difference in the meaning of his aphorism. Properties, social entities, ideas, feelings, judgments, etc. originate in the human mind. However, Protagoras has never suggested that man must be the measure of stars or the motion of the stars.

Parmenides 
Parmenides employed an ontological version of the law of non-contradiction to prove that being is and to deny the void, change, and motion. He also similarly disproved contrary propositions. In his poem On Nature, he said,

The nature of the ‘is’ or what-is in Parmenides is a highly contentious subject. Some have taken it to be whatever exists, some to be whatever is or can be the object of scientific inquiry.

Socrates 
In Plato's early dialogues, Socrates uses the elenctic method to investigate the nature or definition of ethical concepts such as justice or virtue. Elenctic refutation depends on a dichotomous thesis, one that may be divided into exactly two mutually exclusive parts, only one of which may be true. Then Socrates goes on to demonstrate the contrary of the commonly accepted part using the law of non-contradiction. According to Gregory Vlastos, the method has the following steps:
 Socrates' interlocutor asserts a thesis, for example, "Courage is endurance of the soul", which Socrates considers false and targets for refutation.
 Socrates secures his interlocutor's agreement to further premises, for example, "Courage is a fine thing" and "Ignorant endurance is not a fine thing".
 Socrates then argues, and the interlocutor agrees, that these further premises imply the contrary of the original thesis, in this case, it leads to: "courage is not endurance of the soul".
 Socrates then claims that he has shown that his interlocutor's thesis is false and that its negation is true.

Plato's synthesis 
Plato's version of the law of non-contradiction states that "The same thing clearly cannot act or be acted upon in the same part or in relation to the same thing at the same time, in contrary ways" (The Republic (436b)). In this, Plato carefully phrases three axiomatic restrictions on action or reaction: in the same part, in the same relation, at the same time. The effect is to momentarily create a frozen, timeless state, somewhat like figures frozen in action on the frieze of the Parthenon.

This way, he accomplishes two essential goals for his philosophy. First, he logically separates the Platonic world of constant change from the formally knowable world of momentarily fixed physical objects. Second, he provides the conditions for the dialectic method to be used in finding definitions, as for example in the Sophist. So Plato's law of non-contradiction is the empirically derived necessary starting point for all else he has to say.

In contrast, Aristotle reverses Plato's order of derivation. Rather than starting with experience, Aristotle begins a priori with the law of non-contradiction as the fundamental axiom of an analytic philosophical system. This axiom then necessitates the fixed, realist model. Now, he starts with much stronger logical foundations than Plato's non-contrariety of action in reaction to conflicting demands from the three parts of the soul.

Aristotle's contribution 
The traditional source of the law of non-contradiction is Aristotle's Metaphysics where he gives three different versions.
Ontological: "It is impossible that the same thing belong and not belong to the same thing at the same time and in the same respect." (1005b19-20)
Psychological: "No one can believe that the same thing can (at the same time) be and not be." (1005b23–24)
Logical (aka the medieval Lex Contradictoriarum): "The most certain of all basic principles is that contradictory propositions are not true simultaneously." (1011b13-14)

Aristotle attempts several proofs of this law.  He first argues that every expression has a single meaning (otherwise we could not communicate with one another).  This rules out the possibility that by "to be a man", "not to be a man" is meant.  But "man" means "two-footed animal" (for example), and so if anything is a man, it is necessary (by virtue of the meaning of "man") that it must be a two-footed animal, and so it is impossible at the same time for it not to be a two-footed animal.  Thus "it is not possible to say truly at the same time that the same thing is and is not a man" (Metaphysics 1006b 35).  Another argument is that anyone who believes something cannot believe its contradiction (1008b).

Why does he not just get up first thing and walk into a well or, if he finds one, over a cliff?  In fact, he seems rather careful about cliffs and wells.

Avicenna 
Avicenna's commentary on the Metaphysics illustrates the common view that the law of non-contradiction "and their like are among the things that do not require our elaboration." Avicenna’s words for "the obdurate" are quite facetious: "he must be subjected to the conflagration of fire, since 'fire' and 'not fire' are one. Pain must be inflicted on him through beating, since 'pain' and 'no pain' are one. And he must be denied food and drink, since eating and drinking and the abstention from both are one [and the same]."

Indian philosophy 
The law of non-contradiction is found in ancient Indian logic as a meta-rule in the Shrauta Sutras, the grammar of Pāṇini, and the Brahma Sutras attributed to Vyasa. It was later elaborated on by medieval commentators such as Madhvacharya.

Leibniz and Kant 
Leibniz and Kant both used the law of non contradiction to define the difference between analytic and synthetic propositions. For Leibniz, analytic statements follow from the law of non contradiction, and synthetic ones from the principle of sufficient reason.

Russell

The principle was stated as a theorem of propositional logic by Russell and Whitehead in  Principia Mathematica as:

Dialetheism 

Graham Priest advocates the view that under some conditions, some statements can be both true and false simultaneously, or may be true and false at different times. Dialetheism arises from formal logical paradoxes, such as the Liar's paradox and Russell's paradox.

Alleged impossibility of its proof or denial 
The law of non-contradiction is alleged to be neither verifiable nor falsifiable, on the grounds that any proof or disproof must use the law itself prior to reaching the conclusion. In other words, in order to verify or falsify the laws of logic one must resort to logic as a weapon, an act which is argued to be self-defeating. Since the early 20th century, certain logicians have proposed logics that deny the validity of the law. 

Logics known as "paraconsistent" are inconsistency-tolerant logics in that there, from P together with ¬P, it doesn't imply that any proposition follows. Nevertheless, not all paraconsistent logics deny the law of non-contradiction and some such logics even prove it.

Some, such as David Lewis, have objected to paraconsistent logic on the ground that it is simply impossible for a statement and its negation to be jointly true. A related objection is that "negation" in paraconsistent logic is not really negation; it is merely a subcontrary-forming operator.

In popular culture 

The Fargo episode "The Law of Non-Contradiction", which takes its name from the law, was noted for its several elements relating to the law of non-contradiction, as the episode's main character faces several paradoxes. For example, she is still the acting chief of police while having been demoted from the position, and tries to investigate a man that both was and was not named Ennis Stussy, and who both was and was not her stepfather. It also features the story of a robot who, after having spent millions of years unable to help humanity, is told that he greatly helped mankind all along by observing history.

See also 

 Contradiction
 First principle
 Law of identity
 Oxymoron
 Peirce's law
 Principle of bivalence
 Principle of sufficient reason
 Trivialism

References

Bibliography 
 
 Béziau (2000).
 Lewis, David (1982), "Logic for equivocators", reprinted in Papers in Philosophical Logic, Cambridge University Press (1997), p. 97-110.
 .
 Slater (1995).

Further reading

External links 
 S. M. Cohen, "Aristotle on the Principle of Non-Contradiction", Canadian Journal of Philosophy, Vol. 16, No. 3.
 James Danaher (2004), "The Laws of Thought", The Philosopher, Vol. LXXXXII No. 1.
 Paula Gottlieb, "Aristotle on Non-contradiction" (Stanford Encyclopedia of Philosophy).
 Laurence Horn, "Contradiction" (Stanford Encyclopedia of Philosophy).
 Graham Priest and Francesco Berto, "Dialetheism" (Stanford Encyclopedia of Philosophy).
 Graham Priest and Koji Tanaka, "Paraconsistent logic" (Stanford Encyclopedia of Philosophy).
Orestes J. Gonzalez, Actus Essendi and the Habit of the First Principle in Thomas Aquinas (New York: Einsiedler Press, 2019).
 Peter Suber, "Non-Contradiction and Excluded Middle", Earlham College.

Classical logic
Theorems in propositional logic